Mokhlesur Rahman is a Awami League politician and the former Member of Parliament of Dhaka-23.

Career
Rahman was elected to parliament from Dhaka-23 as a Awami League candidate in 1979.

References

Awami League politicians
Living people
2nd Jatiya Sangsad members
Year of birth missing (living people)